Alcanzar una estrella II (English title: To reach a star II) is a Mexican telenovela produced by Luis de Llano Macedo for Televisa in 1991. It is the sequel to Alcanzar una estrella.

Sasha Sokol, Ricky Martin, Angélica Rivera, Erik Rubín, Bibi Gaytan and Pedro Fernández starred as protagonists, while José Alonso, Silvia Pasquel and Eduardo Palomo starred as antagonists. Eduardo Capetillo and Mariana Garza starred as special participation.

Plot
Eduardo puts out a call to all of Mexico's youth to find members for his new musical group, Muñecos de papel ("Paper Dolls"), but at last minute he cancels everything to go on tour with his beloved Lorena.  The group decides to forge ahead without Eduardo, and thus six young people get to live their dreams of achieving fame and fortune.  The series addresses many problems facing today's youth in the anecdotes about the lives of the members of the band.

Cast

Soundtrack
 Alcanzar una estrella II (Album)

Awards and nominations

References

External links 
 

1991 telenovelas
Mexican telenovelas
1991 Mexican television series debuts
1991 Mexican television series endings
Spanish-language telenovelas
Television shows set in Mexico City
Televisa telenovelas